"I'm Somebody" is a single by Canadian country music artist Charlie Major. Released in 1993, it was the second single Major's debut album, The Other Side. The song reached #1 on the RPM Country Tracks chart in December 1993.

Chart performance

Year-end charts

References

1993 singles
Charlie Major songs
Songs written by Charlie Major
Songs written by Barry Brown (Canadian musician)
1993 songs